The 1990 Giro d'Italia was the 73rd edition of the Giro d'Italia, one of cycling's Grand Tours. The Giro began in Bari, with an individual time trial on 18 May, and Stage 11 occurred on 28 May with a stage from Cuneo. The race finished in Milan on 6 June.

Stage 11
28 May 1990 — Cuneo to Lodi,

Stage 12
29 May 1990 — Brescia to Baselga di Pinè,

Stage 13
30 May 1990 — Baselga di Pinè to Udine,

Stage 14
31 May 1990 — Klagenfurt to Klagenfurt,

Stage 15
1 June 1990 — Velden am Wörther See to Dobbiaco,

Stage 16
2 June 1990 — Dobbiaco to Passo Pordoi,

Stage 17
3 June 1990 — Moena to Aprica,

Stage 18
4 June 1990 — Aprica to Gallarate,

Stage 19
5 June 1990 — Gallarate to Sacro Monte di Varese,  (ITT)

Stage 20
6 June 1990 — Milan to Milan,

References

1990 Giro d'Italia
Giro d'Italia stages